Ali Reza Latifi (born September 16, 1984) is an Iranian former footballer.

Club career

Latifi joined Saipa F.C. in 2010, after spending the previous two seasons at Saba Qom.

 Assist Goals

References

1984 births
Living people
Iranian footballers
Saipa F.C. players
Saba players
Gostaresh Foulad F.C. players
Association football defenders